Jerzy Radziwiłł (1480 – April 1541), nicknamed "Herkules", was a Polish–Lithuanian nobleman.

He was Deputy Cup-Bearer of Lithuania from 1510, voivode of Kiev Voivodeship from 1510, Field Hetman of Lithuania in 1521, castellan of Trakai from 1522, castellan of Vilnius from 1527, Marshal of the Court from 1528, Grand Hetman of Lithuania from 1531, Starost of Hrodna, Namiestnik of Vilnius, Maišiagala, Mereck, Utena, Mozyrsk, Lida, Skidal, Kryńsk and Oziersk. He was a progenitor of the Biržai–Dubingiai (also known as Protestant) Radziwiłł family line.

He was renowned for his military achievements and as a talented politician.  He took part in various conflicts against Muscovy, the Cossacks and the Tatars. Achieving around 30 military victories, he has been referred as the Lithuanian Hercules.

In 1526 as a member of the Lithuanian Council of Lords he unsuccessfully petitioned the Grand Duke of Lithuania Sigismund I the Old for the renewal of a Kingdom of Lithuania under the rule of Sigismund the Old's son, Sigismund II Augustus. In the 1530s, acting with his brother Jan Radziwiłł, he was in almost total control of Lithuania's internal affairs.

As a member of influential Radziwiłł family, Jerzy worked to increase his family estate. With his death it was inherited by his only son Mikołaj "the Red" Radziwiłł. He had two daughters, of which the younger Barbara Radziwiłł became mistress and later queen to King of Poland and Grand Duke of Lithuania Sigismund Augustus, which greatly strengthened the Radziwiłł family's position in Poland and Lithuania.

Marriage and issue

He married Barbara Kiszka h. Dąbrowa and later Barbara Kola h. Junosza. They had three children:

 Mikołaj "the Red" Radziwiłł (1512–1584), who would later become Grand Hetman of Lithuania, married to Katarzyna Tomicka from Iwno h. Łodzia
 Anna Elżbieta Radziwiłł  (1518–1558), married Symeon Holszański Dubrowicki h. Hipocentaur and marszałek of Volhynia Piotr Kiszka h. Dąbrowa (died 1550) in 1548
 Barbara Radziwiłł (1520–1551), married Stanisław Gasztołd and after his death in 1547 secretly married king of Poland Sigismund II Augustus and was crowned the queen consort the following year, despite protests by the Sejm and the Senate

References

1480 births
1541 deaths
Jerzy
Great Hetmans of the Grand Duchy of Lithuania
Court Marshals of the Grand Duchy of Lithuania
Field Hetmans of the Grand Duchy of Lithuania